Jouko Santeri Kuha (born 30 September 1939 in Ranua) is a Finnish former long-distance runner, who specialized in the 3000 metres steeplechase. In 1968 he broke the World record with a result of 8:24.2.

Career 

Kuha's international breakthrough was at the Finland-Sweden athletics international in 1965 when he beat Bengt Persson with the Finnish record of 8:37.6. In the same year he was ranked ninth at the annual ranking of Track and Field News.

At the 1966 European Championships in Budapest Kuha ran a new Finnish record of 8:36.2 in the heats, but did not qualify for the final. Kuha realized that in order to reach the world's top he would be forced to leave Finland's winter conditions and conduct his training in warmer climates. He was the first Finnish runner to train in foreign countries, thus becoming a trendsetter for later Finnish runners who had success in the 1970s.

In 1967 Kuha improved his Finnish record with a time of 8:29.8 in Stockholm, that season's second best time in the world after Gaston Roelants. In the same year he won the 3000 metres steeplechase at the Universiades in Tokyo. He ranked fifth in Track and Field News' annual world ranking in 1967.

He prepared to spend the summer of 1968 training in the village of Penedo in Itatiaia, Brazil. That year, he set a world record on  17 July in Stockholm. His 1000 metres lap time was only 2:51.0, 1500 metres 4:17.2, and 2000 metres 5:43.2. However, Kuha was known for his fast final laps and again he sprinted to a world record time of 8:24.2, over 2 seconds faster than the previous record by Gaston Roelants. Kuha knew that as a sea-level inhabitant he would not succeed at the high altitude of Mexico City and therefore he did not travel to the 1968 Summer Olympics. He ranked tenth in Track and Field News' annual world ranking in 1968.

Kuha's top season ended after Achilles tendon surgery in 1969. He still continued his career at the national level and competed at the Finnish Championships in Athletics at the age of 40 in 1980.

Trivia 

Kuha's world record was threatened to be disqualified, because competition organizers provided bib numbers with the BP logo, which was against amateur athletic's rules in that era.

Kuha did not earn much money during his career. One week after setting the world record, he competed in Joensuu before well over 6000 spectators. Kuha had agreed to a fee the previous spring of 600 Finnish markkas, which corresponds to 824 Euros in 2008 currency.

During his career 1958–95 Kuha ran the 3000 metres steeplechase 170 times. At the age of 41 (1981) he ran with a time of 9:00.61 and at about two months prior to his 50th birthday in 1989, 9:37.79.

References

External links
Tilastopaja profile for Jouko Kuha (in Finnish)
Track & Field News Men's World Rankings, 1947-2002

1939 births
Living people
People from Ranua
Finnish male long-distance runners
World record setters in athletics (track and field)
Finnish male steeplechase runners
Universiade medalists in athletics (track and field)
Universiade gold medalists for Finland
Medalists at the 1967 Summer Universiade
Sportspeople from Lapland (Finland)